
Ox is a restaurant in Belfast, Northern Ireland. It has had a Michelin star since 2016.

Head chef of Ox is Stephen Toman.

Awards
 Michelin star: since 2016

See also
List of Michelin starred restaurants in Ireland

References

External links
Official Site

Culture in Belfast
Michelin Guide starred restaurants in Ireland